Ewan is a surname. Notable people with the surname include:

Caleb Ewan (born 1994), Australian cyclist
Chris Ewan (born 1976), British writer
Gregor Ewan (born 1971), Scottish wheelchair curler
Joseph Ewan (1909–1999), American botanist, naturalist, and historian of science